This is a timeline documenting events of Jazz in the year 1981.

Events

April
 10 – The 8th Vossajazz started in Voss, Norway (April 10 – 12).

May
 20 – 9th Nattjazz started in Bergen, Norway (May 20 – June 3).

June
 2 – The 2nd Montreal International Jazz Festival started in Montreal, Quebec, Canada (July  2 – 10).
 5 – 10th Moers Festival started in Moers, Germany (June 5 – 8).

July
 3 – The 15th Montreux Jazz Festival started in Montreux, Switzerland (July 3 – 19).
 10 – The 6th North Sea Jazz Festival started in The Hague, Netherlands (July 10 – 12).

September
 18 – The 24th Monterey Jazz Festival started in Monterey, California (September 18 – 20).

Album releases

Stanley Clarke and George Duke: The Clarke/Duke Project
Al Jarreau: Breakin' Away
Lee Ritenour: Rit
Ronald Shannon Jackson: Street Priest
Jan Garbarek: Paths, Prints
Anthony Davis: Episteme
Joe McPhee: Topology
Paul Motian: Psalm
Rova Saxophone Quartet: As Was
Marilyn Crispell: Spirit Music
Muhal Richard Abrams: Blues Forever
Henry Kaiser: Aloha
Sergey Kuryokhin: The Ways of Freedom
David Moss: Terrain
David Murray: Home
Frank Lowe: Skizoke
Willem Breuker: In Holland
Ronald Shannon Jackson: Nasty
Billy Bang: Rainbow Gladiator
Don Moye: Black Paladins
Frederic Hand: Heart's Song
Jaco Pastorius: Word of Mouth
Joanne Brackeen: Special Identity
Hal Russell: NRG Ensemble
Marvin Peterson: The Angels of Atlanta
Oscar Peterson: Nigerian Marketplace
Saheb Sarbib: Aisha
Steve Douglas: Rainbow Suite
Steve Khan: Eyewitness
Wynton Marsalis: Wynton Marsalis
Keith Tippett: Mujician 
Larry Carlton: Strikes Twice
Pharoah Sanders: Rejoice

Deaths

 January
 9 – Cozy Cole, American drummer (born 1909).
 21 – Russell Procope, American clarinettist and alto saxophonist (born 1908).

 February
 23 – Shep Fields, American bandleader, clarinetist, and tenor saxophonist (born 1910).
 28 – Jean Robert, Belgian saxophonist (born 1908).

 March
 5 – Red Saunders, American drummer and bandleader (born 1912).
 20 – Sonny Red, American alto saxophonist (born 1932).

 April
 3 – Polo Barnes, American clarinetist and saxophonist (born 1901).
 29 – Cat Anderson, American trumpeter (born 1916).

 May
 12 – Frank Weir, British orchestra leader and saxophonist (born 1911).
 25 – Georg Malmstén, Finnish singer, musician, composer, orchestra conductor, and actor (born 1902).
 28 – Mary Lou Williams, African-American pianist and composer (born 1910).

 July
 21 –  Snub Mosley, American trombonist (born 1905).

 August
 3 – Seymour Österwall, Swedish tenor saxophonist, bandleader, and composer (born 1908).
 4 – Tommy Turk, American trombonist (born 1927).
 24 – Bill Coleman, American trumpeter (born 1904).

 September
 9
 Fernand Coppieters, Belgian pianist and organist (born 1905).
 Helen Humes, American singer (born 1913).
 13 – Bob Bates, American upright bassist (born 1923).

 December
 15 – Samuel Jones, American upright bassist, cellist and composer (born 1924).
 17 – Roy McCloud, American cornetist (born 1909).
 27 – Hoagy Carmichael, American composer, pianist, singer, actor, and bandleader (born 1899).

Births

 January
 18 – Martin Taxt, Norwegian tubist.

 February
 18 – Kamasi Washington, American saxophonist, composer, producer, and bandleader.
 20 – Chris Thile, American mandolinist, singer, songwriter, composer, and radio personality.
 24 – Gwilym Simcock, British pianist and composer.

 March
 10
 Elina Duni, Albanian singer and composer.
 Lars Horntveth, Norwegian multi-instrumentalist, band leader, and composer.
 13 – Ivo Neame, British pianist, saxophonist, and composer, Phronesis.

 April
 3 – Erik Nylander, Swedish drummer, improviser, and composer, Magic Pocket.
 27 – Hilde Marie Kjersem, Norwegian singer and songwriter.

 May
 3 – Alexander Hawkins, British pianist, bandleader, and composer.
 19 – Dan Forshaw, English saxophonist and educator.
 20 – Carmen Souza, Portuguese singer and songwriter of Cape Verdean heritage.

 June
 3 – Sam Amidon, American singer and songwriter.
 16 – Ola Kvernberg, Norwegian violinist and composer.

 July
 13
 Olavi Louhivuori, Finnish drummer and composer.
 Sigurd Hole, Norwegian upright bassist, Eple Trio.
 21 – Paloma Faith, English singer, songwriter, and actress.

 August
 8 – Maria Ylipää, Finnish singer and actress.
 14 – Thomas Morgan, American upright bassist and cellist.
 16 – Øystein Moen, Norwegian pianist and keyboarder.
 26 – Gwyneth Herbert, British singer-songwriter, composer, multi-instrumentalist, and record producer.

 September
 3 – Jørgen Munkeby, Norwegian multi-instrumentalist and singer.

 October
 18 – Sarah Buechi, Swiss singer.
 20 – Kaori Kobayashi, Japanese saxophonist and flautist. 
 24 – Fredrik Mikkelsen, Norwegian guitarist and composer.
 26 – Erlend Slettevoll, Norwegian pianist, Grand General.

 December
 17 – Kim Myhr, Norwegian guitarist and composer, Trondheim Jazz Orchestra.
 18 – Maciej Obara, Polish saxophonist.

 Unknown date
 Anders Thorén, Swedish drummer.
 Andy Davies, Welsh trumpeter.
 Ivar Loe Bjørnstad, Norwegian drummer.

See also

 1980s in jazz
 List of years in jazz
 1981 in music

References

External links 
 History Of Jazz Timeline: 1981 at All About Jazz

Jazz
Jazz by year